DC-Jam Records is a Midwest American record label founded in 2006 by Darron Hemann that focuses primarily on punk rock, ska, and experimental music. Darron Hemann</ref> The label features well-known classic punk rock artists such as T.S.O.L., JFA, Fishbone, Meat Puppets, Richie Ramone, The Adicts, Down By Law, Ultrabomb, Trusty, and Government Issue, and several others including The Soviet Machines, Porcupine, The Ragged Jubilee, Onward, etc., Luicidal, Dirty Filthy Mugs, The Generators, Kirkwood Dellinger Downtown Brown, and Fast Piece of Furniture (featuring Jeff Nelson of Dischord Records and Minor Threat).

Discography
 16 Hi-Fi Hits Compilation LP
 Meat Puppets “Live in Manchester England” LP Picture Disc
 The Soviet Machines LP
 #Goals CD
 Porcupine “What You’ve Heard Isn’t Real” EP & CD
Porcupine “Carrier Wave” LP & CD
 The Adicts All The Young Droogs CD & LP
 Fishbone Crazy Glue LP & CD
 Fishbone Live PIC DISC LP x2
 Government Issue The Punk Remains The Same CD & 7"
 JFA Speed of Sound CD
 JFA To All Our Friends CD & LP
 T.S.O.L. Life Liberty & the Pursuit of Free Downloads PIC DISC LP
 Dirty Filthy Mugs All Yobs In CD & PIC DISC LP
 Dirty Filthy Mugs Bodkin Downs 7"
 Dirty Filthy Mugs Up in The Downs CD
 300 Pounds Trail of Numbered Days CD
 Downtown Brown Grabbleton Beach CD
Downtown Brown “2001-2011” CD
Downtown Brown “Masterz of the Universe” LP & CD
 Fast Piece of Furniture Adventures in Contentment LP
 Frontside Five Resurrection Cemetery CD
Luicidal LP & CD
 The Heard Genesis CD
 Kirkwood Dellinger Gold CD
 Machine 22 Off The Record CD
 Minus One The Kids Don't Skate Here CD
Minus One “No Sign of Angels” CD
Minus One “Anthems of Byzanthium, The Early Years ‘81-‘86” CD
Fishbone & Slightly Stoopid Split 7”
 Neon Wilderness (band)|Neon Wilderness Pure Power CD
 Painted Willie Mind Bowling CD
 Onward, etc. “Sonder On” CD
 The Rudy Schwartz Project Bowling for Appliances CD
 The Rudy Schwartz Project Delicious Ass Frenzy CD
 The Rudy Schwartz Project “Winter Dance of the Koala Sperm Harvest” CD
 The Rudy Schwartz Project “Full Frontal Klugman” CD
 The Rudy Schwartz Project “Don’t Get Puffy, Get Charred” CD
The Rudy Schwartz Project “Salmon Dave” CD
 The Rudy Schwartz Project Remembering a Summertime Rash CD
 The Rudy Schwartz Project The Year They Switched to Cornmeal CD
 Trusty Demo CD
 Venomous Preserved Emergencies CD
 The Generators Last of The Pariahs CD
 Richie Ramone Entitled CD & LP
 Richie Ramone “Cellophane” CD & LP

Compilations
 Various	“DC-Jam Skate Rock Vol.1”	CD X2

 Various “17 Hi-Fi Hits” LP

References

External links
 Official site
 Punker Pages bio
 Punk Globe: Interview with founder, Darron Hemman

American independent record labels
Punk record labels